The 1950 United States House of Representatives elections was an election for the United States House of Representatives to elect members to serve in the 82nd United States Congress. They were held for the most part on November 7, 1950, while Maine held theirs on September 11. These elections occurred in the middle of President Harry Truman's second term.

As the Korean War began and Truman's personal popularity plummeted for a second time during his presidency, his Democratic Party lost a net 28 seats to the Republican Party. This was the first election since 1908 where no third parties acquired any seats in the House.

Special elections 

There were six special elections throughout the year, listed here by date and district.

Overall results

Source: Election Statistics - Office of the Clerk

Alabama

Arizona

Arkansas

California

Colorado

Connecticut

Delaware

Florida

Georgia

Idaho

Illinois

Indiana

Iowa

Kansas

Kentucky

Louisiana

Maine

Maryland

Massachusetts

Michigan

Minnesota

Mississippi

Missouri

Montana

Nebraska

Nevada

New Hampshire

New Jersey

New Mexico

New York

North Carolina

North Dakota

Ohio

Oklahoma

Oregon

Pennsylvania

Rhode Island

South Carolina

South Dakota

Tennessee

Texas

Utah

Vermont

Virginia

Washington

West Virginia

Wisconsin

Wyoming

Non-voting delegates

Alaska Territory

See also
 1950 United States elections
 1950 United States Senate elections
 81st United States Congress
 82nd United States Congress

Notes

References